These are the results for the boys' 10 metre air pistol event at the 2018 Summer Youth Olympics.

Results

Qualification

Final

References
 Qualification results
 Final results

Shooting at the 2018 Summer Youth Olympics